Catch Me Now (Traditional Chinese: 原來愛上賊) is a TVB modern action series broadcast in April 2008.

Synopsis 

Ko Chit (Damian Lau) lost his parents to an accidental fire in his teenage years, mourning with resignation until he realizes the fire was caused by a wealthy businessman's greed. Ever since then, his belief in the law has been overcome by his own morals. He gives the businessman a warning by robbing large sums of money (which he donates to various charities) and deceiving him into believing that he killed his son (who was actually unscathed). Many years pass since then, and Ko Chit has become a criminal mastermind, forming a modern-day Robin Hood thievery group consisting of 4 other members, who he had helped or saved:

Tam Bun (Johnson Lee), the hacker. Known as BT or Ben, he is Ko Chit's younger cousin. He was kicked out of a prestigious university due to his hacking into the school system.
Kwan Yun (Wilson Tsui), the locksmith and bomb-maker. Known as Keyman, he was previously hired by Ko Chit to fix his lock. Kwan Yun was about to commit suicide due to financial issues, but was saved by Ko Chit.
Che Hei Sin (Eric Li), the mad driver. As a teenager, he had participated in gang activities and stole and raced cars for fun. Sin stole Chit's car once and could have escaped, but instead he swerves and crashes in order to avoid hitting an old lady. Chit, sensing compassion and needing someone to operate a getaway car for operations, leads him out of gang life and invites him into this modern-day Robin Hood group.
Wong Ming Cheung (Koni Lui), the sniper. An aspiring actress born in the Middle East, she is always given background and unimportant roles. In an attempt for better roles, she finds herself dragged to a bar with a few directors, and is repeatedly offered alcohol. After refusing to drink, one of the directors demand a one-night stand with her and points a gun to her head after she refuses. Cheung, having lived in Iraq with about a decade's worth of experience, expertly re-assembles the gun and neatly turns the table, much to the humiliation of the directors. This scene is witnessed by Ko Chit, who later saves her when the directors send a gang after Cheung for embarrassing the directors. She is known as "Long-legged Crab" due to her long legs.

Years pass with them all rich and happy, with millions donated to charities anonymously through Chit's lawyer. However, things start to get complicated when a certain drug dealer is followed up by Kong Yeung (Joe Ma), a very intelligent CID inspector. That same dealer has his goods targeted by Ko Chit and his team, leading to a battle of wits between Inspector Yeung and the Robin Hood group. Things become even more complicated when Yeung realizes that Chit may have been responsible for his mentor's death in a robbery that took place 5 years ago, which only adds on to his aggression for nailing Chit. But, not everything may be so clearly black and white...

Cast

Alternate ending
According to the producer, the series originally had three different endings planned out, but the cast argued that the ending in which Ko Chit died would be the most memorable. Thus, the official ending has Ko Chit shot by police in gun firing chaos. However, as the audience wanted a perfect ending, TVB decided to create an alternate ending which became available online at TVB.com five minutes after the original airing date and time of the last episode.

Viewership ratings

Awards and nominations
41st TVB Anniversary Awards (2008)
 "Best Drama"
 "Best Actor in a Leading Role" (Damian Lau - Jack Ko Chit)
 "Best Actor in a Supporting Role" (Johnson Lee - Ben Tam Bun)
 "Best Actress in a Supporting Role" (Sharon Chan - Kong Kiu)

References

External links 
Official Page Catch Me Now - Official Website 

TVB dramas
2008 Hong Kong television series debuts
2008 Hong Kong television series endings